"What If I Told You That I Love You" is a song by Iraqi–Canadian singer and songwriter Ali Gatie, It was released at January 23, 2020, as a single through Li$n and Warner Records. The song was written by Danny Schofield, Ali Gatie, Samuel Wishkoski and produced by Ali Gatie, Danny Schofield, Sam Wish.

Background
Gatie told Rolling Stone about the song's inspiration: “Everyone’s been in that situation where they weren’t sure if they should confess their feelings or keep it to themselves, and most of the time you regret not saying how you feel.”

The song is a breezy, sex & springtime-fresh midtempo track, with Gatie’s sparkling vocals caressing the sparse beat from producers DannyBoyStyles and Sam Wish.

Music video
The music video was released on March 3, 2020, directed by Justin Abernethy. It featured Gatie sitting alone at a diner, reflected on a love interest.

And clips has a nostalgic vibe, set in an American diner, a bowling alley and a retro car. Think dimmed neon lighting, seamless transitions and plenty of couples making and breaking.

Remix
Dutch Future House DJ and producer Don Diablo remixed the track "What If I Told You That I Love You" on April 4, 2020.

Charts

Weekly charts

Year-end charts

Certifications

References

2020 songs
2020 singles
Ali Gatie songs